Hendrik (Henry) de Vries (17 August 1896 in Groningen, Netherlands – 18 November 1989 in Haren, Netherlands) was a significant Dutch poet and painter. He was an early surrealist, was liberal-minded, and preached vitality. The subconscious mind plays a crucial role in his poetry.

Much his inspiration came from his interest in Spain and Spanish culture. He visited Spain frequently and became proficient enough to write many poems in Spanish.

De Vries had many collections of his poetry, writings, and artworks published during his lifetime. He also contributed to the literary magazine Het Getij (The Tide).

De Vries' work was included in the 1939 exhibition and sale Onze Kunst van Heden (Our Art of Today) at the Rijksmuseum in Amsterdam.

Prizes

 1946 - Henrdrik Vriesprijs (Hendrik de Vries Prize)
 1948 - Lucy B. and C.W. van der Hoogtprijs (Lucy B. and C.W. van der Hoog Prize) for Toovertuin
 1951 - Special prize from the Jan Campert Foundation for his essay-writing poetry about poetry
 1956 - Additional prize from Jan Campert Foundation
 1959 - Cultural prize of the province of Groningen for his entire oeuvre
 1962 - Constantijn Huygensprijs for his entire oeuvre
 1973 - P.C. Hooftprijs for his entire oeuvre

Bibliography

 1917 - Het gat in Mars en het Milagrat (The Hole in Mars and Milagrat)
 1920 - De nacht (The Night)
 1920 - Vlamrood (Flame red)
 1923 - Lofzangen (Praise Songs)
 1928 - Silenen
 1931 - Spaansche volksliederen (Spanish Folk songs)
 1932 - Stormfakkels
 1935 - Copla's
 1937 - Atlantische balladen (Atlantic Ballads)
 1937 - Geïmproviseerd bouquet (Improvised Bouquet)
 1937 - Nergal
 1939 - Romantische rhapsodie (Romantic Rhapsody)
 1944 - Robijnen (clandestien gedrukt) / Ruby (clandestinely printed during WWII)
 1946 - Capricho's en rijmkritieken
 1946 - Toovertuin
 1951 - Distels en aloë's
 1955 - Gitaarfantasieën (Guitar Fanasties)
 1958 - Groninger symphonie (Groninger symphony)
 1965 - Iberia, krans van reisherinneringen
 1966 - Diseño jondo
 1971 - Cantos extraviados
 1971 - Goyescos
 1978 - Impulsen (Impulses)
 1993 - Verzamelde gedichten (Collected Poems)
 1996 - Sprookjes (Storytelling)

References

External links
 Hendrik de Vries in the Digital Library for the Dutch Arts
 View original Dutch Wikipedia page for Hendrik de Vries

1896 births
1989 deaths
Dutch male poets
People from Groningen (city)
Constantijn Huygens Prize winners
P. C. Hooft Award winners
20th-century Dutch painters
Dutch male painters
20th-century Dutch poets
20th-century Dutch male writers
20th-century Dutch male artists
Painters from Groningen